Girls from Ipanema, previously titled Most Beautiful Thing, is a Brazilian period drama streaming television series created by Giuliano Cedroni and Heather Roth. Produced by Prodigo Films, the series had as producers Francesco Civita and Beto Gauss, and Caíto Ortiz as showrunner. It stars Maria Casadevall, Pathy Dejesus, Fernanda Vasconcellos, Mel Lisboa, Leandro Lima and Ícaro Silva. The first season, consisting of seven episodes, premiered on Netflix worldwide on March 22, 2019. On May 13, 2019, Netflix renewed the series for a second season. The second season consists of 6 episodes and was released June 19, 2020.

Plot
Girls from Ipanema follows the story of Malu (Maria Casadevall), a young and wealthy woman from São Paulo who moves to Rio de Janeiro to open a restaurant with her husband. Upon arriving, she discovers that he has abandoned her and fled with all the money. Malu then leaves in search of a new dream amid the emergence of bossa nova in the city with a new love, the musician Chico.

Cast and characters

Main
 Maria Casadevall as Maria Luiza "Malu" Carone
 Pathy Dejesus as Adélia Araújo
 Fernanda Vasconcellos as Lígia Soares (season 1; guest season 2)
 Mel Lisboa as Thereza Soares
 Leandro Lima as Francisco "Chico" Carvalho
 Ícaro Silva as Capitão 
 Alexandre Cioletti as Nelson Soares
 Gustavo Vaz as Augusto Soares
 Gustavo Machado as Roberto
 Larissa Nunes as Ivone Araújo (season 2–present; recurring season 1)

Recurring
Esther Góes as Eleonora Soares
Ondina Clais Castilho as Ester Carone
Paulo Tiefenthaler as Nanico
Enrico Cazzola	as Carlinhos Carone
Sarah Vitória as Conceição Araújo
Thaila Ayala as Helô Albuquerque (season 1)
João Bourbonnais as Ademar Carone (season 1)
Kiko Bertholini as Pedro Furtado (season 2)
Alejandro Claveaux as Wagner Pessanha (season 2)
Val Perré as Duque Araújo (season 2)
Eliana Pittman as Elza Ferreira (season 2)
Breno Ferreira as Miltinho (season 2)

Episodes

Season 1 (2019)

Season 2 (2020)

Production
On November 6, 2017, Netflix announced the production of a new Brazilian series which would be set in the 1950s with the rise of bossa nova as a backdrop. The series was titled "Coisa Mais Linda" inspired by the song The Girl from Ipanema recorded by João Gilberto and Tom Jobim. On June 29, 2018 is announced the cast of the series and the shooting was initiated in the first week of July, going until October.

Reception

Critical reception  
Tess Cagle from The Daily Dot gave the series a 4 out of 5 stars, saying that "Coisa Mais Linda honors the resilience of women from the time period". Writing in Decider, Joel Keller described the series as a "lush look at a woman stuck between her conservative life in São Paulo and the more open life she wants in Rio". The Review Geek gave the series a 7.5 out of 10, commenting that the show "may not have the most original premise" but praising that "the unique blend of aesthetic beauty and character chemistry are enough to keep this one engaging and watchable throughout".

Soundtrack
The soundtrack of the series was composed and produced by João Erbetta. It was released on music streaming services including Spotify, Deezer and Tidal.

Season 1 songs

 "Ver o Mar (feat. Leandro Lima) (Versão Disco)" 
 "Ver o Mar (feat. Leandro Lima) (Versão Barco)" 
 "Luz do Seu Olhar (feat. Leandro Lima)" 
 "Para Ver Você (feat. Leandro Lima & Fernanda Vasconcellos)" 
 "Morning Song" 
 "Passions" 
 "Com que Roupa Eu Vou" 
 "Branca" 
 "Minha Vida (feat. Marcela Maita)" 
 "Nas Ruas do Rio (feat. Nuria Nogueira & Daniel de Paula)" 
 "O Samba É (feat. Nuria Nogueira)" 
 "Show do Capitão"

References

External links
 
 

2010s Brazilian television series
2019 Brazilian television series debuts
2020 Brazilian television series endings
Brazilian drama television series
Portuguese-language Netflix original programming
Brazilian LGBT-related television shows
LGBT-related web series
Bisexuality-related television series
Lesbian-related television shows
Television series set in the 1950s
Television shows set in Rio de Janeiro (city)
Television shows set in São Paulo